Steffi Graf defeated Chris Evert in the final, 6–1, 7–6(7–3) to win the women's singles tennis title at the 1988 Australian Open. It was her first step towards completing the first, and so far only Golden Slam in the history of pedestrian tennis.

Hana Mandlíková was the defending champion, but was defeated by Graf in the quarterfinals.

This tournament marked Evert's 34th (and last) appearance in a major singles final, an all-time record. It was also her sixth Australian Open final in as many attempts. This was the first major final played under a roof. There was a 1-hour and 23-minute delay to close the roof at 1–1 in the first set.

Martina Navratilova's streak of eleven consecutive major final appearances ended (starting from the 1985 French Open) when she lost to Evert in the semifinals.

This was the first edition of the tournament to be held on hardcourts, having previously been played on grass.

Seeds

Bunge's position in the draw was taken over by lucky loser, Katie Rickett; Turnbull was replaced by lucky loser Jill Smoller

Qualifying

Draw

Finals

Top half

Section 1

Section 2

Section 3

Section 4

Bottom half

Section 5

Section 6

Section 7

Section 8

See also
 Evert–Navratilova rivalry

External links
 1988 Australian Open – Women's draws and results at the International Tennis Federation

Women's singles
Australian Open (tennis) by year – Women's singles
1988 in women's tennis